Sithobela is a town in southern central Eswatini about 160 kilometres directly south of the capital Mbabane.

References

Populated places in Eswatini